is a Japanese competitor in synchronised swimming.

Career 
Kijima participated for the 2018 Asian Games, where she won a silver medal in the team event as well as the 2019 World Aquatics Championships.  
She qualified for the 2020 Summer Olympics, in the team event.

References

External links 
 

1999 births
Living people
Japanese synchronized swimmers
Synchronized swimmers at the 2020 Summer Olympics
Olympic synchronized swimmers of Japan
Sportspeople from Ishikawa Prefecture
Asian Games medalists in artistic swimming
Artistic swimmers at the 2018 Asian Games
Asian Games silver medalists for Japan
Medalists at the 2018 Asian Games
World Aquatics Championships medalists in synchronised swimming
Artistic swimmers at the 2022 World Aquatics Championships
21st-century Japanese women